The white-backed thrush or Kessler's thrush (Turdus kessleri) is a species of bird in the family Turdidae. It is found in central China. Its natural habitats are temperate forests and temperate shrubland.

References

External links
Images at ADW

Kessler's thrush
Birds of Central China
white-backed thrush
Taxonomy articles created by Polbot